The Hobson-Hill House, at 108 South 100 West in Richmond, Utah, was listed on the National Register of Historic Places in 2004.  It has also been known as the Louis & Clara Merrill House and as the George & Maud Bair House.  The listing included three contributing buildings.

It is a brick cross wing house with Victorian Eclectic stylings, built upon a rubble foundation.  Its oldest portion was built around 1883: a one-and-a-half-story red brick house with a lean-to extension.  A frame ell to the west was added around 1900.  It became a cross-wing plan house with a c.1905 yellow brick addition to the north.

References

National Register of Historic Places in Cache County, Utah
Victorian architecture in Utah
Houses completed in 1883